Taiwanese singer Jolin Tsai has performed on five concert tours (128 shows in total) and 21 one-off concerts. In 2004, she embarked on the J1 World Tour, which held eight shows in Asia and North America. In 2006, Tsai embarked on the Dancing Forever World Tour, which grossed NT$1 billion from 28 shows and 500,000 attendance in Asia, Oceania, and North America.

In 2010, she embarked on the Myself World Tour, which grossed NT$1.5 billion from 35 shows and 600,000 attendance in Asia, Europe, and Oceania. In 2015, Tsai embarked on the Play World Tour, which grossed NT$1.5 billion from 34 shows and 600,000 attendance in Asia and North America. In 2019, Tsai embarked on the Ugly Beauty World Tour, which grossed NT$680 million from 23 shows and 250,000 attendance in Asia.

Concert tours

One-off concerts

References

 
Lists of concerts and performances